FIA Formula 4, also called FIA F4, is an open-wheel racing car category intended for junior drivers. There is no global championship, but rather individual nations or regions can host their own championships in compliance with a universal set of rules and specifications.

The category was created by the Fédération Internationale de l'Automobile (FIA)—the International sanctioning and administrative body for motorsport—as an entry-level category for young drivers, bridging the gap between karting and Formula 3. The series is a part of the FIA Global Pathway. Former Formula One driver Gerhard Berger was appointed as the FIA Single-Seater Commission president to oversee the creation of the category as a response to declining interest in national Formula 3 championships due to rising costs and alternate pathways to Formula One such as the then Formula Renault and GP2 and GP3 Series, which had seen several national Formula 3 championships discontinued. In the place of the expensive categories, a number of separate categories running under the Formula 4 name had been created, for example the British based the former BRDC Formula 4. There was no commonality between the cars from country to country. The FIA-endorsed category was formally created in March 2013, when it was approved by the World Motor Sport Council.

Initially, these Formula 4 championships started in 2014 as a single-make category before the regulations were opened up to multiple chassis and engine manufacturers. The engines are equalised so that no one Formula 4 championship is faster than the others, with the long-term intention being to bring the cost down to under €100,000 per year to compete.

Homologated chassis manufacturers
To become eligible for FIA Formula 4, the chassis must meet the FIA homologation requirements respecting technical and commercial regulations.
Four chassis manufacturers have been approved by the FIA: Tatuus, Mygale, Dome and Ligier.

Homologated engines

To become an eligible FIA Formula 4 engine, the engine must meet the homologation requirements. According to the homologation requirements a FIA Formula 4 engine must last at least 10,000 km and have a maximum purchasing price of €9,500. According to the FIA Formula 4 technical regulations only four cylinder engines are allowed. Both normally aspirated and turbocharged engines are permitted. The power output has been capped at 160 bhp. The engine displacement is unlimited. Currently six engines are homologated for use in the FIA Formula 4.

FIA Formula 4 Championships
These championships are held to Formula 4 regulations and approved by the FIA as the national Formula 4 series. Drivers participating in these series can receive FIA Super Licence points, which are required to drive in Formula One. For a series to be eligible for Super Licence points, a season must be held over at least 5 events at a minimum of 3 circuits, according to FIA Appendix L.

Other Formula 4 championships

Formula Academy Finland 

Formula Academy Finland is a racing series based in Finland. Its first season was 2018. Formula Academy Finland uses same Tatuus-Abarth FIA Formula 4 car as ADAC Formula 4, Italian Formula 4 Championship and several other series. The series, however, is not approved by the FIA. There are plans to apply for Finnish Championship status for 2019 season. The series is organized by Koiranen GP.
 More recently as of 2020, the series has run alongside older F3 chassis as a part of the Finnish Championship Series' category Formula Open Finland.

Formula Pro USA Western Championships 

The FPU Western Championships take place at west coast tracks in the United States. It is a feeder series to the FIA recognized United States F4 Championship, and utilizes the identical chassis, engine, and tire package.

Fórmula Academy Sudamericana

The Fórmula Academy Sudamericana (Portuguese: Fórmula Academy Sul-Americana), previously known as Fórmula 4 Sudamericana, is a Formula 4 racing class that debuted in 2014. The class uses the same Signatech chassis and Fiat engines used previously in the Brazilian-based Formula Future Fiat.

JAF Japan Formula 4

Japan Formula 4 is a formula racing series in Japan. The series was founded in 1993 by the Japan Automobile Federation as a class between the FJ1600 series and the All-Japan Formula Three Championship. Japanese Formula 4 is an open formula, where competitors can choose the chassis and engine manufacturers.

Canada CASC Formula 4 / F4

This is based on a non-FIA formulae, instead using 750cc motorcycle engines as power plants. Chassis are typically locally produced such as Xpit and Gamma and cars are fueled by methanol. Popular in the CASC Ontario region at a club level only since 1974.

FIA Central European Zone Championship / Drexler Formel 4 Cup

Although it's an FIA zone championship, the single-seater races in the FIA CEZ Championship have a division for Formula 4 cars, but they are not part of the FIA ladder. The races are co-organized with the Austrian, Czech and Hungarian national championships, as well as the Italian Topjet F2000 Trophy and Austrian Drexler AFR Pokale, the latter allowing cars of similar performance to FIA cars in its F4 division, such as Formula BMW, Czech F1400 and ADAC Formel Masters.

USF Juniors

Organised by Andersen Promotions, the promoter of the Road to Indy USF2000 and Indy Pro 2000 for the United States Auto Club, the USF Juniors series for 14 and 15-year old drivers transitioning from karts will initially use the Ligier JS4 currently used by United States Formula 4 with the homologated Honda engine provided by the Road to Indy spec engine builder (which is different from the US F4 championship, where the engines come from Honda itself), before switching to the Tatuus USF-22, a variant of the Tatuus F4 chassis with the Mazda MZR engine, in 2023.  Unlike the Hankook tires for North American series, the USAC series will have tyres provided by the Goodyear Tire and Rubber Company featuring Cooper branding.  This series will not be part of the FIA ladder and instead will be feed to the Road to Indy ladder, with six meetings, one of which will be an NTT IndyCar Series meeting, and also events at a NASCAR Camping World Truck Series round, Road to Indy Summit training, and the winner earning a funded drive in the next season's USF2000 championship.

GB4 Championship 
Organized by MSV in the collaboration with British Racing Drivers' Club. The GB4 Championship races alongside GB3 Championship during the British GT Championship events and acts as its feeder series and requires lower financial contribution than F4 British Championship certified by FIA. It uses Tatuus F4 T-014 chassis, Abarth 414TF 1.4L engine and Pirelli tires. Despite using the same package as the most continental European Formula 4 championships prior 2022, only one national F4 series can be recognized by FIA, thus it is ineligible for the Super License points.

Fórmula 4 Chile 
Organised by Campeonato Nacional de Carreras Federado, the series uses the Tatuus FA010 chassis from Formula Abarth, one of the predecessors of the Formula 4 car.

Former Formula 4 championships

ADAC Formula 4  Championship 
The ADAC Formula 4 Championship was held from 2015 to 2022. On 3 December 2022, ADAC announced that ADAC Formula 4 would not be organized for the 2023 season, with the focus on placing the German junior drivers in the French F4 Championship instead. The main reason for the decision was the low number of participating drivers due to the high costs compared to other Formula 4 championships.

F4 Argentina Championship 
The F4 Argentina Championship was held in 2021.

Australian Formula 4 Championship 
The Australian Formula 4 Championship was held from 2015 to 2019 before its discontinuation due to a lack of entries.

SMP F4 Championship 
The SMP F4 Championship was held from 2016 to 2019 before losing its FIA certification.

Formula 4 South East Asia Championship 
The Formula 4 South East Asia Championship was held from 2015 to 2019. The start of the 2020 season was postponed due to the COVID-19 pandemic, with plans to announce a shortened race calendar before being called off.

BRDC Formula 4 Championship

The BRDC Formula 4 Championship was an entry level motorsport series based in the United Kingdom which began in 2013. Run by the British Racing Drivers' Club and MotorSport Vision, the series used identical cars built by Ralph Firman Racing and engines from Ford, before switching to FIA Formula 4 regulations in 2015, using the Tatuus F4–T014 chassis. Although run to the FIA's regulations, it was not recognised by the FIA as an official Formula 4 championship. In 2016, the series was upgraded and renamed the BRDC British Formula 3 Championship.

See also
 List of Formula 4 champions

References

External links

 FIA Technical Regulations for Formula 4

 
Formula racing
Open wheel racing